The inelative case (abbreviated ) expresses the notion "from inside" (i.e. "out of").

It can be found in the Lezgian language. For example:

In Lezgian, it can also expression the notion "(in return) for". For example:

Notes

Grammatical cases